Robert H. "Bob" Zieger (August 2, 1938 – March 6, 2013) was a labor historian whose research focused on the labor history of the United States.

Biography

Early years
Robert H. Zieger was born August 2, 1938, in Englewood, New Jersey to John and Grace (Harman) Zieger.  He married Gay Pitman in 1962. They had one child, Robert, and a granddaughter Persephone Zieger.

Zieger received his bachelor's degree from Montclair State College in 1960, a master's degree from the University of Wyoming in 1961, and his doctorate in history from the University of Maryland in 1965.

Career
Zieger obtained an appointment as an assistant professor of history at the University of Wisconsin–Stevens Point in 1964, rising to associate professor by 1973. He was an associate professor of history at Kansas State University from 1973 to 1977, and a professor of history at Wayne State University from 1977 to 1986.

In 1986, Zieger was appointed professor of history at the University of Florida.  He was named Distinguished Professor of History in 1998.

Zieger’s teaching style was very student oriented. He used a very detailed website that allows people taking his class to fully understand every single day of lecture. Also, he was adamant about making sure his undergraduates come prepared to discuss the material to be covered in class. This has twofold benefit, as it not only ensures preparation, but also allows students to boost their grade with frequent quizzes covering the reading material.

Awards and memberships
Zieger's books have twice won the Philip Taft Labor History Book Award for the best book in labor history.

In 1985, Zieger's Rebuilding the Pulp and Paper Workers' Union, 1933–1941 was a Taft Prize co-winner with Paul Avrich's The Haymarket Tragedy.

Zieger won the Taft Prize again in 1995 for his 1994 book, The CIO, 1935–1955.

Zieger was a member of the Organization of American Historians and the Southern Historical Association.  He was also a member of the Historians of American Communism, and served as the organization's president from  the 1989 to 1992.

Children
Zieger had one child, who he named after himself. A Michigan native, Robert attended the University of Michigan in Ann Arbor, and after a foray into social work, received his M.A.T. from Duke University. In the course of his career, he has taught a range of social studies courses in the United States, Pakistan, Myanmar, Indonesia, the D.R. Congo, and Bolivia. Robert Zieger has a wife and a eleven year old daughter, Persephone Zieger. Robert currently now teaches Social Studies and Psychology in Dunecrest American School, Dubai.

Works
 Robin Hood in the Silk City: The I.W.W. and the Paterson Silk Strike of 1913. Newark, N.J.: New Jersey Historical Society, 1966.
 Republicans and Labor, 1919–1929. Lexington, Ky.: University of Kentucky Press, 1969. online
 Madison's Battery Workers, 1934–1952: A History of Federal Labor Union 19587. Ithaca, N.Y.: ILR Press, 1977. online
 Rebuilding the Pulp and Paper Workers' Union, 1933–1941. Knoxville, Tenn.: University of Tennessee Press, 1985. online
 John L. Lewis: Labor Leader. New York: Twayne Publishers, 1988. online
 Organized Labor in the Twentieth-Century South. Knoxville, Tenn.: University of Tennessee Press, 1991. online
 Labor on the March. With Edward Levinson. Ithaca, N.Y.: ILR Press, 1995
 Southern Labor in Transition, 1940–1995. Robert H. Zieger, ed. Knoxville, Tenn.: University of Tennessee Press, 1997.
 The CIO, 1935–1955 (Chapel Hill, NC: University of North Carolina Press, 1997) online
 America's Great War: World War 1 and the American Experience. Lanham, Md.: Rowman and Littlefield Publishers, 2000. online
 American Workers, American Unions: The Twentieth Century. With Gilbert J. Gail. Baltimore: Johns Hopkins University Press, 3rd edition 2002. online
 For Jobs and Freedom: Race and Labor in America since 1865. Lexington, KY: University of Kentucky Press, 2007.

Footnotes

Who's Who in America. 59th ed. New Providence, N.J.: Marquis Who's Who, 2005.

External links
Historians of American Communism
Philip Taft Labor History Book Award
Southern Historical Association
In Memoriam Announcement from UF's Department of History

Historians from New Jersey
Historians of the United States
People from Englewood, New Jersey
Labor historians
Montclair State University alumni
University of Maryland, College Park alumni
1938 births
2013 deaths
University of Florida faculty
Historians of the Industrial Workers of the World
Wayne State University faculty